Medary may refer to:

Places
United States
 Medary, Wisconsin, a town
 Medary (community), Wisconsin, an unincorporated community
 Medary, South Dakota, an unincorporated community

People with the surname
 Milton Bennett Medary, American architect
 Samuel Medary, American politician

See also
 Medaryville, Indiana, a town